The Custos Rotulorum of Louth was the highest civil officer in County Louth.

Incumbents
1656–?1675: Henry Moore, 1st Earl of Drogheda (died 1675)  
?1675–?1679 : ?Charles Moore, 2nd Earl of Drogheda (died 1679)
1679–? : Henry Hamilton-Moore, 3rd Earl of Drogheda (died 1714)
1769–1798: James Hamilton, 2nd Earl of Clanbrassill
1798–1800: John Foster
1800–1820: Robert Jocelyn, 2nd Earl of Roden
1820–1849: Robert Jocelyn, 3rd Earl of Roden

For later custodes rotulorum, see Lord Lieutenant of Louth

References

Louth